Greenwood is a community in the Canadian province of Nova Scotia, located  in Pictou County.

References
Greenwood on Destination Nova Scotia

Communities in Pictou County
General Service Areas in Nova Scotia